Enrique Fernández may refer to:

Artist and entertainers
 Enrique Fernández Arbós (1863–1939), Spanish violinist and composer
 Enrique Fernández (director) (born 1953), Uruguayan filmmaker

Sportspeople
 Enrique Fernández (footballer, born 1912) (1912–1985), Uruguay international football midfielder and manager
 Enrique Fernández (footballer, born 1944), Argentina international football midfielder
 Enrique Fernández (footballer, born 2003), Spanish football midfielder for Real Betis

Other people
 Enrique Fernández Prado (1940–2018), Spanish businessman
 Enrique Fernández Heredia (fl. 1932–1938), Republican military commander in the Spanish Civil War